The men's 400 metres was an event at the 1984 Summer Olympics in Los Angeles, California. It was held from August 4 to August 8. Eighty athletes from 56 nations competed. The maximum number of athletes per nation had been set at 3 since the 1930 Olympic Congress. The event was won by Alonzo Babers, returning the United States to the top of the podium for the first time since 1972 (and the 13th time overall). Gabriel Tiacoh won the Ivory Coast's first Olympic medal in any event, with a silver.

Background

This was the twentieth appearance of the event, which is one of 12 athletics events to have been held at every Summer Olympics. None of the finalists from 1980 returned. The favorites were Bert Cameron of Jamaica (winner of the first world championship in 1983) and Americans Antonio McKay and Alonzo Babers.

The British Virgin Islands, Cameroon, Chad, Equatorial Guinea, the Gambia, Mauritius, Mozambique, Nepal, Oman, Rwanda, Somalia, Suriname, Togo, the United Arab Emirates, and Zimbabwe appeared in this event for the first time. The United States made its 19th appearance, most of any nation, having missed only the boycotted 1980 Games.

Competition format

The competition retained the basic four-round format from 1920. The "fastest loser" system, introduced in 1964, was used for the first round. There were 10 first-round heats, each with 8 runners. The top three runners in each heat advanced, along with the next two fastest overall. The 32 quarterfinalists were divided into 4 quarterfinals with 8 runners each; the top four athletes in each quarterfinal heat advanced to the semifinals, with no "fastest loser" spots. The semifinals featured 2 heats of 8 runners each. The top four runners in each semifinal heat advanced, making an eight-man final.

Records

These were the standing world and Olympic records (in seconds) prior to the 1976 Summer Olympics.

No world or Olympic records were set during this event. National records set were:

Schedule

For the first time, the event was held on four separate days, with each round being on a different day.

All times are Pacific Daylight Time (UTC-7)

Results

Round 1

Heat 1

Heat 2

Heat 3

Heat 4

Heat 5

Heat 6

Heat 7

Heat 8

Heat 9

Heat 10

Quarterfinals

Quarterfinal 1

Quarterfinal 2

Quarterfinal 3

Quarterfinal 4

Semifinals

Semifinal 1

Semifinal 2

Cameron pulled up with an injury at 150 metres, hopping for about 20 metres before returning to a run. Despite the injury, he finished fourth to qualify for the final (in which he ultimately would not be able to run).

Final

Cameron was still injured from the semifinal race and could not start the final. Clark led early and held the lead until the final straight. Babers began his successful push from about the 250 metre mark, with Tiacoh behind him. McKay edged Clark and Nix at the finish.

In popular culture
In the UK TV show Little Britain, character Denver Mills is credited as having won the silver medal in the 400 metres at the 1984 Olympics.

See also
 1982 Men's European Championships 400 metres (Athens)
 1984 Men's Friendship Games 400 metres (Moscow)
 1988 Men's Olympic 400 metres (Seoul)

References

External links
  Results

4
400 metres at the Olympics
Men's events at the 1984 Summer Olympics